A snipe is any of about 26 wading bird species in three genera in the family Scolopacidae. They are characterized by a very long, slender bill, eyes placed high on the head, and cryptic/camouflaging plumage. The Gallinago snipes have a nearly worldwide distribution, the Lymnocryptes snipe is restricted to Asia and Europe and the Coenocorypha snipes are found only in the outlying islands of New Zealand.  The four species of painted snipe are not closely related to the typical snipes, and are placed in their own family, the Rostratulidae.

Behaviour
Snipes search for invertebrates in the mud with a "sewing-machine" action of their long bills.  The sensitivity of the bill is caused by filaments belonging to the fifth pair of nerves, which run almost to the tip and open immediately under the soft cuticle in a series of cells; a similar adaptation is found in sandpipers; this adaptation give this portion of the surface of the premaxillaries a honeycomb-like appearance: with these filaments the bird can sense its food in the mud without seeing it.

Diet
Snipes feed mainly on insect larva. Other invertebrate prey include snails, crustacea, and worms. The snipe's bill allows the very tip to remain closed while the snipe slurps up invertebrates.

Habitat

Snipes can be found in various types of wet marshy settings including bogs, swamps, wet meadows, and along rivers, coast lines, and ponds. Snipes avoid settling in areas with dense vegetation, but rather seek marshy areas with patchy cover to hide from predators.

Hunting

Camouflage may enable snipes to remain undetected by hunters in marshland.  The bird is also highly alert and startled easily, rarely staying long in the open.  If the snipe flies, hunters have difficulty wing-shooting due to the bird's erratic flight pattern.

The difficulties involved around hunting snipes gave rise to the military term sniper, which originally meant an expert hunter highly skilled in marksmanship and camouflaging, but later evolved to mean a sharpshooter or a shooter who makes distant shots from concealment.

See also
 Snipe eel
 Snipe hunt
 Woodcock

Footnotes

External links

 Snipe videos on the Internet Bird Collection
 Snipe sonogram at fssbirding.org.uk

Sandpipers
Game birds
 
Bird common names